Events from the year 2012 in Italy:

Incumbents
 President: Giorgio Napolitano
 Prime Minister: Mario Monti

Events
 13 January - Costa Concordia disaster - a cruise liner capsized, killing at least 32 people on board.
 13 January - Italy's credit rating is downgraded to BBB+ by Standard & Poor's.
 15 February - Several Indian fishermen are killed in a firefight between riflemen of the Italian Navy and pirates off the coast of the Kerala, India. The soldiers involved are being held by the authorities in New Delhi. 
 18 February - Pope Benedict XVI creates 22 new cardinals during his fourth consistory. 
 12 May - 85th National Gathering of the Alpini in Bolzano. 
 19 May - Brindisi school bombing
 20 May - 2012 Northern Italy earthquakes - The regions of Emilia-Romagna, Lombardy and Veneto are hit by an earthquake of magnitude 6.0 with the epicenter in the provinces of Modena, Mantua, Ferrara, Rovigo, Bologna and Reggio Emilia. 
 29 May - Emilia-Romagna and Lombardy are again affected by three new strong earthquakes with a magnitude greater than 5 (5.8, 5.3, 5.2). 
 27 September - Italian newspaper editor Alessandro Sallusti is sentenced to 14 months in prison for publishing libelous remarks, in a landmark case that significantly limits free speech in Italy.
 26 September - Former prime minister Silvio Berlusconi is sentenced to 4 years in the first degree (including 3 condoned) in the process of tax fraud on the acquisition of television rights group Mediaset. 
 31 September - The Monti administration endorses the reorganizing of the Provinces, which will start in 2014. The provinces will drop from 86 to 51. Among the most discussed mergers are Livorno with Pisa, Pescara with Chieti and Avellino with Benevento. The Provincial Administration instead will disappear in January 2013. 
 21 December - Prime Minister Mario Monti hands in his resignation to President Giorgio Napolitano.

Music

 18 February- Emma Marrone, wins the 62nd edition of Sanremo with the song "non è l'inferno"

Television

Literature

Sport
 2011–12 Serie A
 2011–12 Serie B
 2011–12 Coppa Italia
 2012 Supercoppa Italiana
 2012 Giro d'Italia
 2012 Giro di Lombardia
 1 July - Italy loses the UEFA Euro 2012 Final to Spain

Deaths in 2012
January 29 – Oscar Luigi Scalfaro, 93, politician and former President
February 19 – Renato Dulbecco, 97, virologist and Nobel Prize laureate
March 1
Lucio Dalla, 68, singer and songwriter
Germano Mosconi, 79, television presenter
March 21 – Tonino Guerra, 92, poet
March 25 – Antonio Tabucchi, 68, writer
July 3 – Sergio Pininfarina, 85, car designer and politician
August 31 – Carlo Maria Martini, 85, prelate and former archbishop of Milan
December 30 – Rita Levi-Montalcini, 103, scientist and Nobel Prize laureate

See also 
 2012 in Italian television
 List of Italian films of 2012

 
Italy
Years of the 21st century in Italy